Dectes nigripilus is a species of longhorn beetles of the subfamily Lamiinae. It was described by Chemsak and Linsley in 1986, and is known from central Mexico.

References

Beetles described in 1986
Acanthocinini